The 1970 Road Atlanta Can-Am race was the seventh round of the 1970 Can-Am season.  It was held September 13, 1970, at Road Atlanta in Braselton, Georgia.

Results
Pole position: Vic Elford, 1:17.420
Fastest lap: Peter Gethin (lap 7) & Peter Revson (lap 26), 1:18.05
Race distance: 
Winner's average speed:

References

External links
Race results

Road Atlanta
Road Atlanta Can-Am
1970 in sports in Georgia (U.S. state)